William Ewer may refer to:

William Norman Ewer, journalist
William Ewer (banker), English merchant, banker and politician